Problemista is a 2023 American comedy film, written, directed, and produced by Julio Torres. It stars Torres, Tilda Swinton, RZA, Isabella Rosselini and Greta Lee. Emma Stone serves as a producer under her Fruit Tree banner.

It had its world premiere at South by Southwest on March 13, 2023.

Cast
 Julio Torres as Alejandro
 Tilda Swinton as Elizabeth
 RZA as Bobby
 Catalina Saavedra as Dolores 
 Isabella Rossellini as Narrator
 Greta Lee as Dalia
 Spike Einbinder as Spray
 Laith Nakil as Khalil
 Larry Owens as Craigslist
 James Scully as Bingham
 Greta Titelman as Celeste
 Kelly McCormack as Sharon
 Megan Stalter as Lili

Production
In July 2021, it was announced Julio Torres and Tilda Swinton would star and direct the film, from a screenplay he wrote, with Emma Stone set to serve as a producer under her Fruit Tree Banner, and A24 set to produce, finance, and distribute. In November 2021, RZA, Isabella Rossellini, Greta Lee, Spike Einbinder, Laith Nakil, Larry Owens, James Scully and Greta Titelman joined the cast of the film.

Principal photography began by November 2021, in New York City.

Release
It had its world premiere at South by Southwest on March 13, 2023.

References

External links
 

2023 films
2023 directorial debut films
A24 (company) films